Parhelophilus consimilis is a Palearctic hoverfly.

Description
External images
For terms see Morphology of Diptera Wing length  7 ·5-8 ·5 mm Apical 1/4 of front tibiae black. Tergite 1 with 2 diagonal dust bands. Face in lateral view protruding beyond frons. Reemer (2000) figures the male genitalia.  
See references for determination.

Distribution
Palearctic Fennoscandia South to Belgium and North France. Ireland East through Britain, Denmark, Poland and North Europe and Russia to eastern Siberia.

Biology
Habitat: Wetland. Fen, transition mire, bog, raised bog and cut-over bog. Flowers 
visited include white umbellifers, Bidens cernua, Menyanthes, Potentilla palustris, Ranunculus. Flies mid June to beginning August.

References

Diptera of Europe
Eristalinae
Insects described in 1863
Taxa named by August Wilhelm Malm